The Nobel Monument is an obelisk in honor of U.S. Nobel laureates, located just northwest of the American Museum of Natural History in Theodore Roosevelt Park in Manhattan (New York City), with the names of U.S. laureates of the Nobel Prize engraved on its western, southern, and eastern sides, and the name and image of Alfred Nobel on the north side. It is the only monument in a New York City park which bears the names of living people.

The west side of the monument lists Nobel laureates up to 1979, the south side continues the list through 2010, and the east side lists the laureates starting in 2011 (as can be seen in the photos in the gallery of images below, although the website of the New York City Department of Parks incorrectly states that the south side lists the names from 1980 to the present).

The monument lists only those laureates who were U.S. citizens when they won the Nobel, so it includes naturalized immigrants such as author Isaac Bashevis Singer and chemist Roald Hoffman but has neither U.S. native T. S. Eliot, who was a naturalized British subject when he won, nor Albert Einstein, who only became a U.S. citizen years after winning. In addition to individuals it also names the American Friends Service Committee (AFSC), a Quaker organization based in the US, which won the Nobel Peace Prize (the only Nobel that groups as well as individuals can win) in 1947; the AFSC's name can be seen in the photograph below of the west side of the monument.

Images of other sides of the Nobel Monument

References

External links

Obelisks in the United States
Monuments and memorials in Manhattan
Outdoor sculptures in Manhattan
Sculptures of men in New York City